McPherson Opera House is an historic opera building at 221 South Main Street in McPherson, Kansas.

The house was built in 1888, opened in 1889 and added to the National Historic Register in 1972.

References

External links

McPherson Opera House website

Buildings and structures in McPherson County, Kansas
Theatres in Kansas
Theatres on the National Register of Historic Places in Kansas
Music venues completed in 1889
Opera houses in Kansas
Theatres completed in 1889
National Register of Historic Places in McPherson County, Kansas
Opera houses on the National Register of Historic Places in Kansas